Fanling-Sheung Shui New Town was developed from the traditional market towns (Luen Wo Hui and Shek Wu Hui) and villages around Fanling and Sheung Shui, within the present-day North District in the New Territories of Hong Kong. It was primarily developed in the mid 1980s. Connecting Fanling and Sheung Shui is an U-shaped main road called Ma Sik Road.  

The new town presently has a population of 247,000, with an ultimate capacity of 264,000 upon full development.

Housing

Fanling Town

Sheung Shui Town

Community 

North District Town Hall   
North District Park

Schools 
Fanling Public School
Lee Chi Tat Memorial School

Hospitals 
North District Hospital  
Hong Chi Fanling Integrative Rehabilitation Complex (C&A Home) (formerly Fanling Hospital)

Shopping centres 
Landmark North
Metropolis Plaza

Transport 

The new town is served by the Fanling, and Sheung Shui stations of the MTR East Rail line, which connects the new town with Kowloon and the border with mainland China at Lo Wu.

The Fanling Highway is a part of Route 9. Other major roads include the Jockey Club Road and San Wan Road.

See also 
 List of buildings, sites and areas in Hong Kong

External links 
Fanling-Sheung Shui New Town
Satellite image of the new town of Fanling-Sheung Shui and its vicinity by Google Maps

New towns in Hong Kong
North District, Hong Kong
New towns started in the 1980s